Ivan A. "Ivo" Pavelić (10 February 1908 – 22 February 2011) was a Croatian swimmer, football player and skier. As a swimmer he competed for Yugoslavia at the 1924 Summer Olympics.

Pavelić was born in Zagreb as the son of politician and dentist Ante Pavelić and experienced his only international swimming tournament at the 1924 Games in Paris, where he failed to advance beyond the first round of the men's 200 metre breaststroke event.

Football career
He won the 1930 Yugoslav Football Championship with HŠK Concordia.

He made his debut for Yugoslavia in an April 1927 friendly match away against Hungary and earned a total of 5 caps, scoring 1 goal. His final international was a November 1930 Balkan Cup match away against Bulgaria.

He eventually graduated from the University of Zagreb with a law degree and opened a private practice in the city after two years of work in the courts. Fluent in five languages, he built an international client base prior to World War II, eventually moving to Switzerland in 1943 during the conflict. While in the country, he competed actively in skiing.

Personal life
Pavelić moved to New York City in 1946 and married his Swiss lover Irene Gmur. Soon after he founded Pavimpex Co., an import/export business focusing on lead and copper, with his brother. He moved to Greenwich, Connecticut in 1951 and continued his business, with an emphasis on specialty gifts from Italy and Austria. He retired in 1975 and his wife died in December 1984. Pavelić himself died in Greenwich in February 2011, at the age of 103.

References

External links
 
 

1908 births
2011 deaths
Footballers from Zagreb
Swimmers from Zagreb
Yugoslav male swimmers
Olympic swimmers of Yugoslavia
Swimmers at the 1924 Summer Olympics
Association football forwards
Yugoslav footballers
Yugoslavia international footballers
HŠK Concordia players
FK BASK players
Yugoslav First League players
Faculty of Law, University of Zagreb alumni
Croatian centenarians
Men centenarians